West Coast Baptist College is an independent Baptist Bible college in Lancaster, California, offering graduate and undergraduate degrees. West Coast opened in 1995 and is a member of the Transnational Association of Christian Colleges and Schools (TRACS), having been awarded Candidate Status on October 27, 2015 then approved for Accredited Status on April 18, 2019.

History 
In July 1986, Paul Chappell became the Pastor of Lancaster Baptist Church in Lancaster, California. In 1988, the church raised an initial $50,000 for the down payment on the first 20 acres of property located on the east side of town. In 1995, Chappell and Lancaster Baptist Church approved the beginning of West Coast Baptist College. West Coast Baptist College started with Chappell, John Goetsch and Mark Rasmussen. Toby Weaver joined the staff and became the Dean of Students. Mike Lester joined the staff as the academic dean. Jerry Goddard is the Administrative Dean. Jim Schettler (former Campus Pastor of Pensacola Christian College) joined the staff in 2013.

In December 2014, the administration of West Coast Baptist College announced their intention to apply for national accreditation with Transnational Association of Christian Colleges and Schools. On October 27, 2015, West Coast Baptist College was awarded candidacy status as a Category III institution by the TRACS Accreditation Commission. On April 17, 2019, the institution was awarded accredited status by the TRACS Accreditation Commission.

Campus

The campus of West Coast Baptist College, extending from Lancaster Boulevard to Avenue J, contains a three story educational building  including private piano practice labs, a science lab, two computer labs, a media lab, classrooms, a two hundred seat north auditorium, a library, a Student Life Center, and a three thousand seat main auditorium. WCBC shares the same campus as Lancaster Baptist Church.

GI Bill Eligibility
Veterans who have earned GI Bill benefits may use them to train for the ministry at West Coast Baptist College.

Beliefs
West Coast is an Independent Fundamental Baptist college. West Coast Baptist College believes the Bible is the inspired Word of God preserved for the English-speaking people in the King James Version. It also believes in deity of Jesus Christ, salvation by grace through faith in Christ alone, and the worship, fellowship, and service of the local church.

Campuses

 Main Campus (4010 E Lancaster Blvd. Lancaster, CA)
 Online
 Cojutepeque, El Salvador

Athletics 

WCBC has a men's basketball program and a ladies volleyball program. They are  a member of the National Christian College Athletic Association (NCCAA), Association of Christian College Athletics (ACCA) and Pacific Christian Athletic Conference. In the 2007-08 season, the West Coast Baptist College athletics received notoriety from the local newspaper. They followed their journey winning season to the national finals. In 2011-2012, they won the NCCAA Regionals against Portland Bible. In February 2012, they defeated Korea University 105-101.

Notable alumni
Nathan Winters – Republican Representative of District 28, Wyoming House of Representatives (Class of 2003)

References

External links
 West Coast Baptist College

Independent Baptist universities and colleges in the United States
Educational institutions established in 1995
King James Only movement
Seminaries and theological colleges in California
1995 establishments in California